"Go on Move" is a song by American solo project Reel 2 Real (Erick Morillo), featuring ragga vocals by Trinidad and Tobago rapper The Mad Stuntman (a.k.a. Mark Quashie). Originally released in 1993 as a single from their debut album, Move It! (1994), it was re-released in 1994 after the success of "I Like to Move It". It became a top-10 hit in Canada, Finland, Ireland, the Netherlands and the UK. In the latter, it reached number seven on the UK Singles Chart. But on the UK Dance Singles Chart, it was a even bigger hit, peaking at number two. In the US, the song peaked at number six on the Billboard Hot Dance Music/Club Play chart, while it peaked at number one on the Canadian RPM Dance/Urban chart.

Critical reception
Pan-European magazine Music & Media commented, "Recommended by Swedish star producer Denniz Pop himself as the sole innovators of pop dance at the moment, the three live up to his endorsement again with a spirited ragga/Euro mix." Andy Beevers from Music Week gave the song five out of five and named it Pick of the Week in the category of Dance, writing, "This single gets a belated UK release in the wake of the phenomenal "I Like to Move It". It shares the winning formula of pumping house rhythms and crowd pleasing ragga chat from The Mad Stuntman. Featuting new mixes from Erick Morillo and Jules & Skins, it is shaping up to be another smash." Tim Jeffery from the RM Dance Update stated that "this is sure to be a chart hit". Another editor, James Hamilton, described it as a "gruff ragga 'g'wan move' shouting and 'blippily bebop' scatting drily percussive 'I Like To Move It' type bogie shuffler".

Music video
The accompanying music video for "Go on Move" was directed by Craig McCall, who had previously directed the video for "I Like to Move It". "Go on Move" was A-listed on Germany's VIVA in August 1994.

Track listings
 12-inch, US (1994)
"Go on Move '94" (Erick "More" 94 Vocal Mix) – 6:14
"Go on Move '94" (Smooth Touch Gets Phearce Dub) – 5:25
"Go on Move '94" (Roy's Deep Dungeon Mix) – 9:02
"Go on Move '94" (Reel 2 Reel '94 Dub) – 4:57

 CD maxi, France (1994)
"Go on Move" (Erick "More" Radio Edit) – 4:12
"Go on Move" (Erick "More" '94 Vocal Mix) – 6:14
"Go on Move" (Smooth Touch Gets Phearce Dub) – 5:25
"Go on Move" (Roy's Deep Dungeon Mix) – 9:02
"Go on Move" (Reel 2 Real '94 Dub) – 4:57
"Go on Move" (Erick "More" Original Mix) – 5:08
"Mad Stuntman" – 3:47

 CD maxi (Remix), Europe (1994)
"Go on Move" (Eric 'More' Morillo 94 Vocal Mix Edit) – 4:10
"Go on Move" (Judge Jules & Michael Skins Scream Up Mix) – 6:19
"Go on Move" (Eric 'More' Morillo 94 Vocal Mix) – 6:14
"Go on Move" (Moveapella) – 3:12

Charts

Weekly charts

Year-end charts

Release history

References

External links
 Erick Morillo website

1993 singles
1993 songs
1994 singles
Positiva Records singles
Reel 2 Real songs
Songs written by The Mad Stuntman
Songs written by Erick Morillo
Strictly Rhythm singles